Mo'Nique is an American actress and comedian. Over the course of her career, she has been the recipient of a number of award wins and nominations, including a 2001 Grammy Award nomination for Best Comedy Album, and for her critically acclaimed role as Mary Lee Johnston in the 2009 film Precious, for which she received more than 60 nominations; in particular, winning the Academy Award for Best Supporting Actress, the Golden Globe Award for Best Supporting Actress – Motion Picture, and the BAFTA Award for Best Actress in a Supporting Role. In 2015, Mo’Nique received a Primetime Emmy Award for Outstanding Supporting Actress in a Limited Series or Movie nomination, for her role in the television movie Bessie.

She has garnered several award wins and nominations for television work, most notably, for her role as Nikki Parker in the sitcom The Parkers (1999–2004), for which she earned four NAACP Image Awards for Outstanding Supporting Actress in a Comedy Series.

The following is a list of awards and nominations received by Mo'Nique.

Major award associations

Academy Awards

BAFTA Awards

Golden Globe Awards

Grammy Awards

Primetime Emmy Awards

Screen Actors Guild Awards

Critics' awards

African-American Film Critics Association

Boston Society of Film Critics

Central Ohio Film Critics Association

Chicago Film Critics Association

Critics' Choice Association

Dallas–Fort Worth Film Critics Association

Denver Film Critics Society

Detroit Film Critics Society

Florida Film Critics Circle

GALECA: The Society of LGBTQ Entertainment Critics

Houston Film Critics Society

IndieWire Critics Poll

International Online Film Critics' Poll

Iowa Film Critics

Kansas City Film Critics Circle

Las Vegas Film Critics Society

London Film Critics' Circle

Los Angeles Film Critics Association

National Society of Film Critics

New York Film Critics Circle

New York Film Critics Online

Online Film Critics Society

Oklahoma Film Critics Circle

Phoenix Film Critics Society

San Diego Film Critics Society

San Francisco Bay Area Film Critics Circle

Southeastern Film Critics Association

St. Louis Gateway Film Critics Association

Toronto Film Critics Association

Utah Film Critics Association

Vancouver Film Critics Circle

Washington D.C. Area Film Critics Association

Other

Alliance of Women Film Journalists

Awards Circuit Community Awards

Beaufort International Film Festival

BET Awards

Black Reel Awards

Chlotrudis Society for Independent Films

CinEuphoria Award

Golden Derby Awards

Golden Schmoes Awards

Independent Spirit Awards

Indiana Film Journalists Association

International Cinephile Society

International Online Cinema Awards

NAACP Image Awards

Online Film & Television Association

Satellite Awards

Stockholm International Film Festival

Sundance Film Festival

Village Voice Film Poll

Women's Image Network Awards

Notes

References

MoNique